Chris Beal (born August 6, 1985) is an American mixed martial artist who formerly competed in the Bantamweight division of the Ultimate Fighting Championship.

Background 
Beal wrestled at Ventura High School where he placed second at the state championship for freestyle wrestling and was a CIF champion. Beal then attended Junior College for two years, one year at Moorpark College and one year at Ventura College. He started training MMA in 2006 after watching a high school friend compete in a mixed martial arts fight.

Mixed martial arts career

Early career
Beal began his professional mixed martial arts career on July 3, 2009 against Andrew Dominquez at CA Fight Syndicate - Throwdown at the Showdown 1, where he won via decision.  He then got a unanimous decision win against Vincent Martinez on October 2, 2009, at CA Fight Syndicate - Throwdown at the Showdown 2.

BAMMA USA 
Beal made his BAMMA USA debut on August 20, 2011, facing Evan Esguerra at Badbeat 3. He won the fight via split decision. He then faced Jimmy Jones at Badbeat 4 on January 13, 2012. Beal won the fight via split decision, extending his BAMMA record to 2–0. For his third fight in the promotion, Beal faced Jose Morales at Badbeat 5 on March 16, 2012. He won via TKO due to elbows in the first round.

In his next fight, Beal took on Kana Hyatt on July 13, 2012, at Badbeat 6. He won the fight via unanimous decision. Beal then faced Shad Smith at Badbeat 7 on October 12, 2012. He won the fight via unanimous decision, and would subsequently take a hiatus to take part on The Ultimate Fighter.

After his brief stint on The Ultimate Fighter, Beal returned to BAMMA USA at Badbeat 12 taking on Keith Carson. He won via TKO in the second round.

The Ultimate Fighter 
On August 15, 2013, it was revealed that Beal would take part in the 18th season of The Ultimate Fighter, with coaches Miesha Tate & UFC Women's Bantamweight Champion Ronda Rousey.

In the first episode, Beal faced Sirwan Kakai to get into the house, defeating him via unanimous decision after two rounds. Beal was chosen as the first male pick for Team Rousey.

In his second bout on the show, Beal faced Team Tate's #1 pick Chris Holdsworth. Beal was submitted in the first round via guillotine choke.

Ultimate Fighting Championship 
Despite being eliminated early on the show, Beal was signed by the UFC.  He made his promotional debut on April 26, 2014 at UFC 172 taking on fellow newcomer Patrick Williams. Beal won the fight via knockout due to a flying knee in the second round, which earned Performance of the Night honors.

For his second bout with the promotion, Beal was expected to face Rob Font on September 5, 2014 at UFC Fight Night 50.  However, Font pulled out of the bout citing an injury.  Subsequently, Beal was briefly paired with Dustin Kimura at the event.  In turn, Kimura also pulled out of the bout and was replaced by Tateki Matsuda.  Beal defeated Matsuda via unanimous decision.

Beal faced Neil Seery in a flyweight bout on January 24, 2015 at UFC on Fox 14. He lost the back-and-forth fight by unanimous decision.

Beal next faced Chris Kelades on August 23, 2015 at UFC Fight Night 74. He lost the fight via split decision.

Beal was expected to face Norifumi Yamamoto in a bantamweight bout on June 18, 2016 at UFC Fight Night 89. However, Yamamoto was scratched from the bout on May 26 for an undisclosed injury. He was replaced by Joe Soto. He lost the back and forth fight via submission in the third round and was subsequently released from the promotion.

Post UFC 
After losing to Alfred Khashakyan via TKO stoppage in the first round at CXF 5, Beal faced John Castañeda, losing via TKO in the second round at Combate Americas 14.

After going 1-1 on the regional scene, Beal faced Josh Rettinghouse at XMMA 5 on July 23, 2022. He lost the fight in the first round after being knocked out.

Championships and achievements

Mixed martial arts
Ultimate Fighting Championship
Performance of the Night (One time)
ESPN 
2014 Knockout of the Year vs. Patrick Williams at UFC 172
MMAJunkie.com
2014 April Knockout of the Month vs. Patrick Williams

Mixed martial arts record 

|-
|
|align=center|
|Francisco Rivera
|
|UNF 6
|
|align=center|
|align=center|
|Commerce, California, United States
|
|-
|Loss
|align=center|11–7
|Josh Rettinghouse
|KO (punches)
|XMMA 5
|
|align=center|1
|align=center|2:10
|Columbia, South Carolina, United States
|
|-
|Win
|align=center|11–6
|James Acosta
|Decision (unanimous)
|WFC 136
|
|align=center|3
|align=center|5:00
|Santa Ynez, California, United States
|
|-
|Loss
|align=center|10–6
|George Garcia
|Decision (majority)
|CXF 12: Burbank Beatdown
|
|align=center|3
|align=center|5:00
|Burbank, California, United States
|
|-
|Loss
|align=center|10–5
|John Castañeda
|TKO (punches)
|Combate 14: Cinco de Mayo
|
|align=center|2
|align=center|0:42
|Ventura, California, United States
|
|-
|Loss
|align=center|10–4
|Alfred Khashakyan
|TKO (punches)
|CXF 5: Night of Champions
|
|align=center|1
|align=center|2:56
|Studio City, California, United States
|
|-
|Loss
|align=center|10–3
|Joe Soto
|Submission (rear-naked choke)
|UFC Fight Night: MacDonald vs. Thompson
|
|align=center|3
|align=center|3:39
|Ottawa, Ontario, Canada
|
|-
|Loss
|align=center|10–2
|Chris Kelades
|Decision (split)
|UFC Fight Night: Holloway vs. Oliveira
|
|align=center|3
|align=center|5:00
|Saskatoon, Saskatchewan, Canada
|
|-
| Loss
|align=center| 10–1
| Neil Seery
| Decision (unanimous)
|UFC on Fox: Gustafsson vs. Johnson
|
|align=center|3
|align=center|5:00
|Stockholm, Sweden
|
|-
| Win
|align=center| 10–0
| Tateki Matsuda
| Decision (unanimous)
|UFC Fight Night: Jacare vs. Mousasi
|
|align=center|3
|align=center|5:00
|Mashantucket, Connecticut, United States
|
|-
| Win
|align=center| 9–0
| Patrick Williams
| KO (flying knee)
|UFC 172
|
|align=center|2
|align=center|1:51
|Baltimore, Maryland, United States
|
|-
| Win
|align=center| 8–0
| Keith Carson
| TKO (punches)
|BAMMA USA - Badbeat 12
|
|align=center|2
|align=center|4:37
|Commerce, California, United States
|
|-
| Win
|align=center| 7–0
| Shad Smith
| Decision (unanimous)
|BAMMA USA - Badbeat 7
|
|align=center|3
|align=center|5:00
|Commerce, California, United States
|
|-
| Win
|align=center| 6–0
| Kana Hyatt
| Decision (unanimous)
|BAMMA USA - Badbeat 6
|
|align=center|3
|align=center|5:00
|Commerce, California, United States
|
|-
| Win
|align=center| 5–0
| Jose Morales
| TKO (elbows)
|BAMMA USA - Badbeat 5
|
|align=center|1
|align=center|4:45
|Commerce, California, United States
|
|-
| Win
|align=center| 4–0
| Jimmy Jones
| Decision (split)
|BAMMA USA - Badbeat 4 & the ALFA League 8
|
|align=center|3
|align=center|5:00
|Commerce, California, United States
|
|-
| Win
|align=center| 3–0
| Evan Esguerra
| Decision (split)
|BAMMA USA - Badbeat 3 & the ALFA League 6
|
|align=center|3
|align=center|5:00
|Commerce, California, United States
|
|-
| Win
|align=center| 2–0
| Vincent Martinez
| Decision (unanimous)
|CA Fight Syndicate - Throwdown at the Showdown 2
|
|align=center|3
|align=center|3:00
|Santa Barbara, California, United States
|
|-
| Win
|align=center| 1–0
| Andrew Dominquez
| Decision (unanimous)
|CA Fight Syndicate - Throwdown at the Showdown 1
|
|align=center|3
|align=center|3:00
|Santa Barbara, California, United States
|
|-

Mixed martial arts exhibition record

|-
|Loss
|align=center|1–1
| Chris Holdsworth
| Submission (guillotine choke) 
| The Ultimate Fighter: Team Rousey vs. Team Tate
| (airdate)
|align=center|1
|align=center|4:16
|Las Vegas, Nevada, United States
|
|-
|-
|Win
|align=center|1–0
| Sirwan Kakai
| Decision (unanimous) 
| The Ultimate Fighter: Team Rousey vs. Team Tate
| (airdate)
|align=center|2
|align=center|5:00
|Las Vegas, Nevada, United States
|
|-

See also
 List of current UFC fighters
 List of male mixed martial artists

References

External links
 
 

1985 births
American male mixed martial artists
African-American mixed martial artists
Mixed martial artists from California
Bantamweight mixed martial artists
Flyweight mixed martial artists
Mixed martial artists utilizing freestyle wrestling
Ultimate Fighting Championship male fighters
American male sport wrestlers
African-American sport wrestlers
Amateur wrestlers
21st-century African-American sportspeople
20th-century African-American sportspeople
Living people